Heinrich Koppel (also Henrik Koppel; 29 December 1863 Tõnuküla, Uusna Parish – 14 December 1944 Tallinn) was an Estonian medical scientist and activist. He is considered one of the founders of Estonian-language higher education.

In 1890 he graduated from Tartu University.

In 1903 he established the magazine Tervis ('Health').

From 1920 to 1928 he was the rector of Tartu University.

Awards:
 1934: Order of the Estonian Red Cross, I class.

References

1863 births
1944 deaths
Estonian physicians
20th-century Estonian scientists
University of Tartu alumni
Rectors of the University of Tartu
People from Viljandi Parish